Penthile was a town of ancient Lesbos.

The site of Penthile is unlocated.

References

Populated places in the ancient Aegean islands
Former populated places in Greece
Ancient Lesbos
Lost ancient cities and towns